Craig Spence may refer to:
Craig Spence (golfer) (born 1974)
Craig Spence (archaeology) (fl. 1990–present), historian and archaeologist
Craig J. Spence (1940–1989), Lobbyist who committed suicide after being named a client of a prostitution ring.